Abd al-Rahman ibn Utba al-Fihri, also known as Ibn Jahdam, was the governor of Egypt for the rival caliph Ibn al-Zubayr in 684, during the Second Fitna.

Egypt's Kharijites proclaimed themselves for Ibn al-Zubayr when he proclaimed himself Caliph at Mecca, and Ibn al-Zubayr dispatched Abd al-Rahman ibn Utba al-Fihri to become the province's governor. Although the incumbent governor, Sa'id ibn Yazid, gave way, the resident Arab elites of the province barely tolerated his presence, and began contacts with the Umayyad caliph Marwan I in Damascus. These contacts encouraged Marwan to march against Egypt, where Abd al-Rahman vainly tried to muster a defence. Although he fortified the capital, Fustat, an army he sent to stop the Umayyad advance at Ayla melted away and his fleet was wrecked by storms. Marwan entered Egypt unopposed, and after a couple of days of clashes before Fustat, the city's nobles surrendered it to him. Abd al-Rahman was allowed to leave Egypt with his possessions.

References

Sources 
 

7th-century Arabs
7th-century Umayyad governors of Egypt
Quraysh